The  is a museum located in Asuka Village, Nara Prefecture in Japan. It is dedicated to the Man'yōshū, an 8th-century anthology of waka poetry. Its honorary director is Susumu Nakanishi.

External links 

  
  

Asuka, Nara
Man'yōshū
Literary museums in Japan
Art museums and galleries in Japan
History museums in Japan
Museums in Nara Prefecture